Rhenish-Hessian Switzerland is a protected landscape and recreation area in the southwest of the German region of Rhenish Hesse (Rheinhessen). It was established in 1961 and has an area of 6,766 hectares.

The following municipalities lies within the protected area:
Bechenheim, Erbes-Büdesheim, Frei-Laubersheim, Fürfeld, Nack, Neu-Bamberg, Nieder-Wiesen, Siefersheim, Stein-Bockenheim, Tiefenthal, Wendelsheim and Wöllstein.

See also 
 Little Switzerland (landscape)

Sources

External links 
 Information about the recreation area
 Information on the collective municipality of Alzey-Land
 Regulation for the protection of the Rhenish-Hessian Switzerland region dated 22 February 1961 (pdf; 41 kB)

Rhenish Hesse
Geography of Rhineland-Palatinate